Ælfheah ( – 19 April 1012), more commonly known today as Alphege, was an Anglo-Saxon Bishop of Winchester, later Archbishop of Canterbury. He became an anchorite before being elected abbot of Bath Abbey. His reputation for piety and sanctity led to his promotion to the episcopate and, eventually, to his becoming archbishop. Ælfheah furthered the cult of Dunstan and also encouraged learning. He was captured by Viking raiders in 1011 during the siege of Canterbury and killed by them the following year after refusing to allow himself to be ransomed. Ælfheah was canonised as a saint in 1078. Thomas Becket, a later Archbishop of Canterbury, prayed to him just before his own murder in Canterbury Cathedral in 1170.

Life
Ælfheah was born around 953, supposedly in Weston on the outskirts of Bath, and became a monk early in life. He first entered the monastery of Deerhurst, but then moved to Bath, where he became an anchorite. He was noted for his piety and austerity and rose to become abbot of Bath Abbey. The 12th century chronicler, William of Malmesbury recorded that Ælfheah was a monk and prior at Glastonbury Abbey, but this is not accepted by all historians. Indications are that Ælfheah became abbot at Bath by 982, perhaps as early as around 977. He perhaps shared authority with his predecessor Æscwig after 968.

Probably due to the influence of Dunstan, the Archbishop of Canterbury (959–988), Ælfheah was elected Bishop of Winchester in 984, and was consecrated on 19 October that year. While bishop he was largely responsible for the construction of a large organ in the cathedral, audible from over a mile (1600 m) away and said to require more than 24 men to operate. He also built and enlarged the city's churches, and promoted the cult of Swithun and his own predecessor, Æthelwold of Winchester. One act promoting Æthelwold's cult was the translation of Æthelwold's body to a new tomb in the cathedral at Winchester, which Ælfheah presided over on 10 September 996.

Following a Viking raid in 994, a peace treaty was agreed with one of the raiders, Olaf Tryggvason. Besides receiving danegeld, Olaf converted to Christianity and undertook never to raid or fight the English again. Ælfheah may have played a part in the treaty negotiations, and it is certain that he confirmed Olaf in his new faith.

In 1006, Ælfheah succeeded Ælfric as Archbishop of Canterbury, taking Swithun's head with him as a relic for the new location. He went to Rome in 1007 to receive his pallium—symbol of his status as an archbishop—from Pope John XVIII, but was robbed during his journey. While at Canterbury, he promoted the cult of Dunstan, ordering the writing of the second Life of Dunstan, which Adelard of Ghent composed between 1006 and 1011. He also introduced new practices into the liturgy, and was instrumental in the Witenagemot's recognition of Wulfsige of Sherborne as a saint in about 1012.

Ælfheah sent Ælfric of Eynsham to Cerne Abbey to take charge of its monastic school. He was present at the council of May 1008 at which Wulfstan II, Archbishop of York, preached his Sermo Lupi ad Anglos (The Sermon of the Wolf to the English), castigating the English for their moral failings and blaming the latter for the tribulations afflicting the country.

In 1011, the Danes again raided England, and from 8–29 September they laid siege to Canterbury. Aided by the treachery of Ælfmaer, whose life Ælfheah had once saved, the raiders succeeded in sacking the city. Ælfheah was taken prisoner and held captive for seven months. Godwine (Bishop of Rochester), Leofrun (abbess of St Mildrith's), and the king's reeve, Ælfweard were captured also, but the abbot of St Augustine's Abbey, Ælfmær, managed to escape. Canterbury Cathedral was plundered and burned by the Danes following Ælfheah's capture.

Death

Ælfheah refused to allow a ransom to be paid for his freedom, and as a result was killed on 19 April 1012 at Greenwich, reputedly on the site of St Alfege's Church. The account of Ælfheah's death appears in the E version of the Anglo-Saxon Chronicle: 

Ælfheah was the first Archbishop of Canterbury to die a violent death. A contemporary report tells that Thorkell the Tall attempted to save Ælfheah from the mob about to kill him by offering everything he owned except for his ship, in exchange for Ælfheah's life; Thorkell's presence is not mentioned in the Anglo-Saxon Chronicle, however. Some sources record that the final blow, with the back of an axe, was delivered as an act of kindness by a Christian convert known as "Thrum." Ælfheah was buried in Old St Paul's Cathedral. In 1023, his body was moved by King Cnut to Canterbury, with great ceremony. Thorkell the Tall was appalled at the brutality of his fellow raiders, and switched sides to the English king Æthelred the Unready following Ælfheah's death.

Veneration

Pope Gregory VII canonised Ælfheah in 1078, with a feast day of 19 April. Lanfranc, the first post-Conquest archbishop, was dubious about some of the saints venerated at Canterbury. He was persuaded of Ælfheah's sanctity, but Ælfheah and Augustine of Canterbury were the only pre-conquest Anglo-Saxon archbishops kept on Canterbury's calendar of saints. Ælfheah's shrine, which had become neglected, was rebuilt and expanded in the early 12th century under Anselm of Canterbury, who was instrumental in retaining Ælfheah's name in the church calendar. After the 1174 fire in Canterbury Cathedral, Ælfheah's remains together with those of Dunstan were placed around the high altar, at which Thomas Becket is said to have commended his life into Ælfheah's care shortly before his martyrdom during the Becket controversy. The new shrine was sealed in lead, and was north of the high altar, sharing the honour with Dunstan's shrine, which was located south of the high altar. A Life of Saint Ælfheah in prose and verse was written by a Canterbury monk named Osbern, at Lanfranc's request. The prose version has survived, but the Life is very much a hagiography; many of the stories it contains have obvious Biblical parallels, making them suspect as a historical record.

In the late medieval period, Ælfheah's feast day was celebrated in Scandinavia, perhaps because of the saint's connection with Cnut. Few church dedications to him are known, with most of them occurring in Kent and one each in London and Winchester; as well as St Alfege's Church in Greenwich, a nearby hospital (1931–1968) was named after him. In Kent, there are two 12th-century parish churches dedicated to St Alphege at Seasalter and Canterbury. Reputedly his body lay in these churches overnight on his way back to Canterbury Cathedral for burial. In the town of Solihull in the West Midlands, St Alphege Church is dedicated to Ælfheah dating back to approximately 1277. In 1929, a new  Roman Catholic church in Bath, the Church of Our Lady & St Alphege, was designed by Giles Gilbert Scott in homage to the ancient Roman church of Santa Maria in Cosmedin, and dedicated to Ælfheah under the name of Alphege. St George the Martyr with St Alphege & St Jude stands in Borough in London.

Notes

Citations

References

Further reading

External links
 

950s births
1012 deaths
People from Bath, Somerset
Anglo-Saxon saints
Archbishops of Canterbury
Bishops of Winchester
Martyred Roman Catholic priests
11th-century Christian saints
11th-century Christian martyrs
Incorrupt saints
Year of birth uncertain
11th-century English Roman Catholic archbishops
Anglican saints
Canonizations by Pope Gregory VII